Jungholtz is a commune in the Haut-Rhin department in Grand Est in north-eastern France.

The Basilica of Our Lady of Thierenbach, formerly the church of Thierenbach Priory, a dissolved Cluniac monastery, is located here.

See also
 Communes of the Haut-Rhin département

References

Communes of Haut-Rhin